Clarks Creek (also known as Clarks Branch) is a stream in Chariton and Linn counties in the U.S. state of Missouri. It is a tributary of Mussel Fork.

It flows south-southwest passing under US Route 36 and east of Marceline to enter Chariton County. It flows south generally parallel and east of Missouri Route 5 passing the community of Mike to enter Mussel Fork at  approximately 3.7 miles west of the community of Mussel Fork.

Clarks Creek has the name of Henry Clark, a pioneer citizen.

See also
List of rivers of Missouri

References

Rivers of Chariton County, Missouri
Rivers of Linn County, Missouri
Rivers of Missouri